The 2000 Moscow Victory Day Parade was held on 9 May 2000 to commemorate the 55th anniversary of the capitulation of Nazi Germany in 1945. The parade marks the Soviet Union's victory in the Great Patriotic War.

Particularities
The parade was commanded by Colonel General Igor Puzanov, Commander of the Moscow Military District, and reviewed by the Minister of Defence, Marshal of the Russian Federation Igor Sergeyev. The historical part of the parade was commanded by the former Moscow Military District commander General of the Army Vladimir Govorov. A speech was made by the newly elected president Vladimir Putin. Unlike other jubilee parades, this one in particular did not see the attendance of foreign heads of state and government as well as foreign delegations. This parade was the last to feature the old national anthem of Russia (used 1990-1991 by the Russian SFSR and 1991-2000 by the Russian Federation). It was also the last parade to feature veterans on foot.

Troops participating in the parade
 The car carrying the commander of historical part of the parade General of the army Vladimir Govorov.
 Corps of Drums of the Moscow Military Music School
 Victory Banner
 Veterans of the Karelian, Leningrad, 1st Baltic, 1st, 2nd and 3rd Belorussian and 1st, 2nd, 3rd and 4th Ukrainian fronts.  These were followed by veterans of the Baltic and Black Sea Fleets of the Soviet Navy.

 The car carrying the commander of the parade Colonel General Ivan Puzanov
Honor Guard Battalion of the 154th Independent Commandant's Regiment
 Great Patriotic War Liberators Regiment (dressed in cloaks and armed with PPSh-41s)
Combined Arms Academy of the Armed Forces of the Russian Federation
 Peter the Great Military Academy of the Strategic Missile Forces
 Military Engineering Academy named after Kuibyshev
Military University of Radiation, Chemical and Biological Defense named after Marshal Timoshenko
Gagarin Air Force Academy
 Military Aviation Technical University named after NE Zhukovsky
Military University of the Ministry of Defense of the Russian Federation
 St. Petersburg Naval Institute
 Moscow Border Institute
 331st Guards Airborne Regiment
Internal Troops of the Ministry of Internal Affairs of Russia
 336th Guards Naval Infantry Brigade of the Baltic Fleet
 Suvorov Military School
 Nakhimov Naval School
Moscow Higher Military Command School

Almost a third of the parade participants arrived in Moscow from the Commonwealth of Independent States and Baltic states.

Music 
The parade on Red Square ended with the passage of the Combined Military Band consisting of the Central Military Band of the Ministry of Defense, the Headquarters of the Moscow Military District, and the Central Navy Band of Russia, numbering 600 musicians, under the direction of Lieutenant General Viktor Afanasyev.

 Inspection and Address
 Potpourri of March of the Preobrazhensky Regiment (Марш Преображенского Полка) and Slow March of the Officers Schools (Встречный Марш офицерских училищ)
 Jubilee Slow March "25 Years of the Red Army" (Юбилейный встречный марш "25 лет РККА) by Semeon Tchernetsky
 Slow March of the Tankmen (Встречный Марш Танкистов) by Semyon Tchernetsky
 Slow March of the Guards of the Navy (Гвардейский Встречный Марш Военно-Морского Флота) by Nikolai Pavlocich Ivanov-Radkevich
 Slow March of the Officers Schools (Встречный Марш офицерских училищ) by Semyon Tchernetsky
 Slow March (Встречный Марш) by Dmitry Pertsev
 Slow March of the Red Army (Встречный Марш Красной Армии) by Semyon Tchernetsky
 March of the Preobrazhensky Regiment (Марш Преображенского Полка)
 Jubilee Slow March "25 Years of the Red Army" (Юбилейный встречный марш "25 лет РККА) by Semeon Tchernetsky
 Slow March of the Tankmen (Встречный Марш Танкистов) by Semyon Tchernetsky
 Slow March of the Guards of the Navy (Гвардейский Встречный Марш Военно-Морского Флота) by Nikolai Pavlocich Ivanov-Radkevich
 Slow March of the Officers Schools (Встречный Марш офицерских училищ) by Semyon Tchernetsky
 Glory (Славься) by Mikhail Glinka
 Parade Fanfare "May 9" (Парадная Фанфара "9 Мая") by Nikolai Camokhvalov
 State Anthem of the Russian Federation (Patriotic Song) – Государственный Гимн Российской Федерации (Патриотическая Песня) by Mikhail Glinka
 Fanfare

 Veteran and Infantry Columns and Conclusion
 Sacred War (Священная Война) by Alexandr Alexandrov
 March from the theme of the song “On an Unknown Hill” (Марш на темы песни «На безымянной высоте»)
 In the Dugout (В землянке) by Alexei Surkov
 Blue Scarf (Синий платочек) by Jerzy Petersbursky
 Farewell of Slavianka (Прощание Славянки) by Vasiliy Agapkin
 Parade Fanfare All Listen! (Парадная Фанфара «Слушайте все!») by Andrei Golovin
 March Victory (Марш "Победа") by Albert Mikhailovich Arutyunov
 In Defense of the Homeland (В защиту Родины) by Viktor Sergeyevich Runov
 On Guard for the Peace (На страже Мира) by Boris Alexandrovich Diev
 Combat March (Строевой Марш) by Dmitry Illarionovich Pertsev
 Air March (Авиамарш) by Yuliy Abramovich Khait
 Leningrad (Ленинград) by Viktor Sergeyeich Runov
 We are the Army of the People (Мы Армия Народа) by Georgy Viktorovich Mavsesya
 We Need One Victory (Нам Нужна Одна Победа) by Bulat Shalvovich Okudzhava
 Sports March (Спортивный Марш) by Valentin Volkov
 On the Road (В Путь) by Vasily Pavlovich Solovyov-Sedoy
 Victory Day (День Победы) by David Fyodorovich Tukhmanov

Gallery

References

External links 
Watch the entire parade here:
 https://www.youtube.com/watch?v=h0vgIoBXrks

Moscow Victory Day Parades
Moscow Victory Day Parade
Moscow Victory Day Parade
Moscow Victory Day Parade
Victory Day Parade